Alfred Boultbee (March 5, 1828 – December 29, 1901) was an Ontario lawyer and political figure. He represented York North in the Legislative Assembly of Ontario from 1871 to 1874 and York East in the House of Commons of Canada as a Conservative member from 1878 to 1882.

He was born in Hampshire, England in 1829 and came to Ancaster Township in Upper Canada with his family in 1836. He articled in law with William Notman and was called to the bar in 1855. He began practice in Newmarket, but later joined Thomas McCulloch Fairbairn in a practice in Peterborough. After the death of Fairbairn in 1874, he moved his practice to Toronto. In 1857, he married Caroline Augusta, the daughter of George Hamilton. He served as reeve for Newmarket for a number of years. With others, Boultbee established the North York Sentinel and served as its editor for several years. He helped organize the local Freemason lodge and held an office in the Grand Lodge of Canada.

References

External links 
Short biography from The History of The Boultbee Family

1828 births
1901 deaths
English emigrants to pre-Confederation Ontario
Progressive Conservative Party of Ontario MPPs
Conservative Party of Canada (1867–1942) MPs
Members of the House of Commons of Canada from Ontario
Mayors of Newmarket, Ontario
Immigrants to Upper Canada